Hospital Pereira Rossell is a hospital in Montevideo, Uruguay. It is located in the barrio Parque Batlle, just west of the park of the same name. It was founded in 1908 and was built on land donated in late 1900 by Alexis Rossell y Rius and Dolores Pereira de Rossell. It was the first paediatric hospital, and shortly afterwards the first maternity hospital when they installed obstetric and gynaecological clinic in 1915. Later the hospital received a donation from Dr. Enrique Pouey for a radiotherapy unit. It has around 700 beds.

References

External links
Official site

Hospital buildings completed in 1908
Children's hospitals
Hospitals in Montevideo
1908 establishments in Uruguay
Child-related organizations in Uruguay